Ángel Cancel Acevedo (born 2 August 1940) in Río Piedras, Puerto Rico is a Puerto Rican former basketball player who competed in the 1960 Summer Olympics, in the 1964 Summer Olympics, and in the 1968 Summer Olympics.

References

External links
 

1940 births
Living people
People from Río Piedras, Puerto Rico
Puerto Rican men's basketball players
1963 FIBA World Championship players
1967 FIBA World Championship players
Olympic basketball players of Puerto Rico
Basketball players at the 1960 Summer Olympics
Basketball players at the 1964 Summer Olympics
Basketball players at the 1968 Summer Olympics
Basketball players at the 1963 Pan American Games
Basketball players at the 1967 Pan American Games
Pan American Games medalists in basketball
Pan American Games bronze medalists for Puerto Rico
Medalists at the 1963 Pan American Games